Weihs may refer to:

 Daniel Weihs (born 1942), Israeli Aeronautical Engineering professor at the Technion – Israel Institute of Technology
 Donald H. Weihs (1922–2016), American soldier and Olympic biathlete
 Felix Weihs de Weldon (1907–2003), Austrian-American sculptor
 Hans-Dieter Weihs, German Luftwaffe fighter ace
 Thomas Weihs (1914–1983)
  (1911–1978), Austrian politician